Judy Jensen (born 1953) is an American artist who resides in Austin, Texas. She is best known for her reverse painting on glass, although she incorporates other mixed media into her glass pieces. According to Nancy Bless, Jensen's works "lie somewhere between a collage and a collection."

Biography
Jensen was born in Lamesa, Texas.  When Jensen first became interested in glass, she began to create stained glass panels. She eventually recognized that painting would be less restrictive. She credits her undergraduate study in cultural and physical anthropology at the University of Texas (1971–1974) for many of the themes and recurring symbols in her work. Her early work features skeletons and fire, while snakes become important in later work. Jensen has said of her work, "My paintings are mystical – not very many things are."

Jensen is involved in a project replacing glass paintings, destroyed in an earthquake, in a 19th-century Buddhist temple in northwestern Thailand. These will depict the Vessantara and Siddhartha incarnations of Buddha. She was awarded a grant from the James H.W. Thompson Foundation in Bangkok in support of the project.

Career 
From 1980 to 1985, Jensen was involved with the Renaissance Glass Company in Austin, Texas, a studio for flat glass artists founded by Susan Stinsmuehlen-Amend and Rodney Smith. There she experimented with a variety of painting techniques, including reverse glass painting.

Jensen has exhibited widely. Solo venues include eight exhibits with New York's Heller Gallery; the Galveston Arts Center; and the Houston Center for Contemporary Crafts. Group exhibitions include Glass Today: American Studio Glass from Cleveland Collections, Cleveland Museum of Art, 1997; Pilchuck Exhibition, Seattle-Tacoma International Airport, 1996–1997; Gerald Peters Gallery in New York; the Smithsonian American Art Museum; Atlanta's High Museum; Tell Me a Story: Narrative Art in Clay and Glass, Eighth Triennale India, New Delhi, 1993; International Exposition of Sculpture Objects, and Functional Art: SOFA, Chicago, IL, 1996; Selections from The Chodorkoff Collection, The Detroit Institute of Arts, MI, 1991; and World Glass Now, The Hokkaido Museum of Modern Art, Sapporo, Japan, 1994.

A National Endowment for the Arts Visual Arts Fellowship recipient (1986), Jensen's works are in numerous public and private collections, including the Royal Ontario Museum, the Smithsonian American Art Museum, the Los Angeles County Museum of Art, The Corning Museum of Glass, McDonald's Corporate Art Collection, and the Washington Art Consortium. For eight years, Judy Jensen worked almost exclusively on commissions.

Museum and public collections

Smithsonian American Art Museum, Washington, D.C.
Royal Ontario Museum, Toronto, Canada
Los Angeles County Museum of Art, Los Angeles, California
Akron Art Museum, Akron, Ohio
Corning Museum of Glass, Corning, New York
The David Jacob Chodorkoff Collection
Detroit Institute of Arts
Racine Art Museum, Racine, Wisconsin
Speed Art Museum, Louisville, Kentucky
Austin-Bergstrom International Airport, Austin, Texas
City of Austin Art in Public Places Offices, Austin, Texas
McDonald's Corporate Collection, Chicago, Illinois
SAFECO Corporate Collection, Seattle, Washington

Awards and honors

James H.W. Thompson Foundation Grant, 2013 (Thai foundation)
Represented Austin/Bergstrom International Airport in MSN.com "Airports with the Best Art", 2009
Curator's Award, Galveston Arts Center, 2007
Best of Show, National Liberty Museum, Philadelphia, PA, 2004
John H. Hauberg Fellowship Residency, Pilchuck Glass School, 2002
Richard Diebenkorn Teaching Fellowship nominee, San Francisco Art Institute, 2000
Most Original Austin Artist, Michael Barnes, Arts Editor, Austin American-Statesman, 1997
Juror, Art Kauai, The Kauai Museum of Art, Hawaii, 1996
Juror's Award, Austin Museum of Art, Texas, 1996
Louis Comfort Tiffany Award nominee, 1993
National Endowment for the Arts Visual Arts Fellowship Grant, 1986
Juror's Award, Contemporary Arts Center, New Orleans, LA, 1985
New Glass Reviews 19, 11, 8, 7, 6, & 5, annual competition documenting the 100 most innovative objects made in glass each year

Selected publications
Judy Jensen: Feverish, 2002, Houston Center for Contemporary Craft. OCLC Number: 51951219
Sculpture, Glass, and American Museums, Martha Drexler Lynn, p. 166, University of Pennsylvania Press,2005. , 
International Glass Art, Richard Yelle, pp. 161–162, Schiffer, 2003. , 
Women Working in Glass, Lucartha Kohler, pp. 161–162. Schiffer Pub., 2003. , 
Glass Art from UrbanGlass, Richard Yelle, p. 109, Schiffer Pub., 2000. , 
Contemporary Glass, Susanne Frantz, p. 28, H.N. Abrams, 1989. , 
"Judy Jensen: Tableaux in Reverse", American Craft, p. 42–45, cover illustration, Oct/Nov '93
"The Glass Canvas", Glass Art, Volume 4, # 6, pp. 4–7, cover illustration, 1989
"Judy Jensen: Dream Spaces", D. Cutler, New Work, #34, pp. 12–17, cover illustration, 1989

References

External links
Artist's website
Jensen at Askart.com
Judy Jensen/Corning Museum of Glass Collections
Judy Jensen/Smithsonian American Art Museum Collections

American glass artists
Women glass artists
1953 births
Living people
Artists from Austin, Texas
People from Lamesa, Texas